The Swiss Women's Volleyball Cup is an annual women's volleyball club competition held every year in switzerland since the year 1962, only three editions were canceled in 1963/64, 1966 and the 2020, the Universität Basel has dominated this competition from the early 60s to the 80s achieving 17 Titles record and then comes Volero Zürich in the 2000s who completes this dominance with 14 titles of whom 9 consecutive between 2010 and 2018

Competition history

Winners list

Honours By Club

References

External links
  Swiss Volleyball Association  

Volleyball in Switzerland